Fifteen or 15 may refer to:
15 (number), the natural number following 14 and preceding 16
one of the years 15 BC, AD 15, 1915, 2015

Music
Fifteen (band), a punk rock band

Albums
 15 (Buckcherry album), 2005
 15 (Ani Lorak album), 2007
 15 (Phatfish album), 2008
 15 (mixtape), a 2018 mixtape by Bhad Bhabie

 Fifteen (Green River Ordinance album), 2016
 Fifteen (The Wailin' Jennys album), 2017
 Fifteen, a 2012 album by Colin James

Songs
"Fifteen" (song), a 2008 song by Taylor Swift
"Fifteen", a song by Harry Belafonte from the album Love Is a Gentle Thing
"15", a song by Rilo Kiley from the album Under the Blacklight
"15", a song by Marilyn Manson from the album The High End of Low
"The 15th", a 1979 song by Wire

Other uses
Fifteen, Ohio, a community in the United States
15 (film), a 2003 Singaporean film
Fifteen (TV series), international release name of Hillside, a Canadian-American teen drama
Fifteen puzzle, a sliding puzzle
Fifteen (novel), a 1956 juvenile fiction novel
Fifteen (confection), a sweet traybake confection from Northern Ireland
Fifteen (novel), a juvenile fiction novel by Beverly Cleary
The Fifteen, the Jacobite rising of 1715 where the House of Stuart attempted to regain the throne of the United Kingdom.
First Aberdeen bus route 15

See also
+15, a skyway system in Calgary
15 rating (disambiguation)
Daimler Fifteen, a 1932 saloon car
Daimler New Fifteen, a 1937 large saloon/sedan car
15th (Scottish) Infantry Division, a British Army division
List of highways numbered 15
15.ai, a real-time artificial intelligence text-to-speech tool